Mechanicsville High School (formerly Lee-Davis High School) is a public high school located in Mechanicsville, Virginia, United States. It serves students in grades 9 through 12 and is part of Hanover County Public Schools.

History
Mechanicsville High School opened in 1959 under the name Lee-Davis High School and received students from the consolidation of Battlefield Park and Washington-Henry High Schools. After the new high school opened, both Battlefield Park and Washington-Henry became elementary schools. Lee-Davis opened in the midst of Massive Resistance, as the State of Virginia opposed desegregation of its public schools, despite the 1954 Supreme Court ruling in Brown v. Board of Education. After opening as an all-white school, Lee-Davis admitted a small number of Black students in 1963, but did not fully integrate until the 1969–1970 school year, after all legal avenues resisting full integration were exhausted.

Naming controversy

The Hanover County School Board named the school “in the memory and honor of two prominent members of the Confederacy, Robert E. Lee and Jefferson Davis.” The two men were featured in the school's logo.

The school's name and mascot were contested since the school was fully integrated in 1969–70. That year, the Hanover chapter of the NAACP appealed to the school board, on behalf of Black athletes, to remove the Confederate moniker from athletic teams because Black athletes didn't want to play as "Confederates." After a poll was taken of the Lee Davis student body, and it found overwhelming approval of the names, the principal decided to keep the name.

In Fall 2018, shortly after the Charlottesville riots, a group of alumni, students, and local residents appealed to the School Board to change the name of Lee-Davis and its feeder school, Stonewall Jackson Middle School. Following a survey, the School Board voted in April to keep the names.

In August 2019, the Hanover County NAACP sued the Hanover County School Board in Federal Court on constitutional grounds. The suit was dismissed by a federal judge in May 2020. In June 2020, the Hanover County NAACP said that it would appeal the ruling.

After the murder of George Floyd in May 2020, another local movement to change the name of LDHS arose. On July 14, 2020, the Hanover County School Board voted to rename both Lee-Davis and Stonewall Jackson in a 4–3 vote. In mid-October, after considering other names such as Twin Rivers High School, the county and its residents agreed on the badge of Mechanicsville High School.

Athletics 
The varsity boys Baseball Team were the Virginia High School League group AAA state champions in both 1997 and 2001.  The girls softball team won the 2011 state championship. Mechanicsville is a nationally recognized Blue Ribbon School. In 2014 and 2015 the boys track team won back to back outdoor 5A state championships.

Performing arts
Mechanicsville has two competitive show choirs, the mixed-gender Madz and the women's-only New Horizons. Together with Hanover High School, Mechanicsville hosts a competition every year.

Notable alumni
 Joe Douglas '94 - General Manager of the New York Jets.
 Gordy Haab - Film, Television and Video Game Composer
 Ryan McDougle - Virginia General Assembly Senator
 Jason Mraz '95 - singer/songwriter
 Latrell Scott – current head coach of Norfolk State University and former head coach of Virginia State University football and former head coach of the Richmond Spiders football team

References

External links 
 
 Hanover County Public Schools website

Educational institutions established in 1959
Public high schools in Virginia
International Baccalaureate schools in Virginia
Schools in Hanover County, Virginia
1959 establishments in Virginia
Name changes due to the George Floyd protests